The Calgary Centennials were a junior ice hockey team that played in the Western Canada Hockey League (WCHL) from 1966–1977.  They played in Calgary, Alberta, Canada at the Stampede Corral.

History
A charter member of the Canadian Major Junior Hockey League in 1966, the franchise was known in its first season as the Calgary Buffaloes before becoming the Centennials (marking Canadian Centennial that year) in the renamed WCHL for the 1967–68 season.

The franchise had a string of successful regular seasons in the early 1970s, winning three West division titles, however playoff success never followed.  The Centennials only reached the WCHL finals once, falling in four straight to the Regina Pats in 1974.

Following the 1976–77 season, the Centennials were sold and relocated to Billings, Montana and became the Billings Bighorns.  Calgarians would not have to wait long for another team, as the Winnipeg Monarchs were sold and relocated to Calgary to become the Calgary Wranglers for the 1978–78 season.

The Centennials franchise today is known as the Tri-City Americans, settling in Kennewick, Washington, after stops as the Billings Bighorns, Nanaimo Islanders, and New Westminster Bruins.

Season-by-season record
Note: GP = Games played, W = Wins, L = Losses, T = Ties Pts = Points, GF = Goals for, GA = Goals against

NHL alumni

Don Ashby
Jeff Bandura
Wayne Bianchin
Brian Carlin
Glen Cochrane
John Davidson
Ed Dyck
Len Frig
Danny Gare
Rick Hodgson
Jerry Holland
Ron Homenuke
Doug Horbul
Kevin Krook
Doug Lecuyer
Craig Levie
Bob Liddington
Darryl Maggs
Lanny McDonald
Nick Merkley
Grant Mulvey
Bob Nystrom
Harvie Pocza
Gary Rissling
Mike Rogers
Randy Rota
Rick Shinske
Roy Sommer
Brian Spencer
Mike Toal
Perry Turnbull
Jimmy Watson

See also
List of ice hockey teams in Alberta
Ice hockey in Calgary
Billings Bighorns
Calgary Wranglers
Calgary Hitmen

References
whl.ca
logoserver.com
2005–06 WHL Guide

Centennials, Calgary
Ice hockey teams in Alberta
Ice hockey clubs established in 1966
Defunct Western Hockey League teams
1966 establishments in Alberta
1977 disestablishments in Alberta